Hlohovec (Hungarian Galgóc), is a town in southwestern Slovakia, with a population of 21,508.

Name
The name comes from *Glogovec, the Old Slavic name for a place densely overgrown by hawthorn. The Hungarian form Galgóc was adopted before a phonological change g > h in Slovak.

History
The first written evidence of its existence is from 1113, when a town with the name Galgocz was mentioned in the so-called Second Zobor Document. In 1362 Hlohovec obtained town privileges.  Ottoman troops captured city and annexed it to the sanjak of Uyvar as the Holok eyalet in 1663. Austrian troops retook it in 1664.

Landmarks

The dominant building is a Renaissance-Baroque castle built in 1720. The castle is built on the place of a pre-existing Slavic settlement and a medieval castle. In the castle area is the Empire theatre built in 1802, a riding school from the 18th century, and a Baroque garden pavilion.

In the middle of St. Michael Square stands the Gothic church of St. Michael with its highly decorated portal. Next to the church is the Chapel of Saint Anna from the 18th century. In the northern border of the central part of the town is the Franciscan church and monastery built in 1492. Part of the monastery premises nowadays occupies the Museum of National History and Geography.

The most visited and beautiful natural part of town is the castle park with its lake, French terraces, and rare wood-species, especially old sycamore trees.

Demographics
According to the 1910 census the town had 7749 inhabitants: 5645 Slovaks, 1401 Hungarians and 667 Germans, 83.6% of the people were Roman Catholic, 13.7% Jewish and 2.1% Lutheran.
According to the 2001 census, the town had 23,729 inhabitants. 97.85% of inhabitants were Slovaks, 0.72% Roma and 0.63% Czechs. The religious make-up was 79.58% Roman Catholics, 14.85% people with no religious affiliation and 2.44% Lutherans.

Notable people

 Heinrich Berté (1858-1924), composer of Dreimäderlhaus.
 Peter Burian (b. 1959), diplomat
 Ján Hollý (1785–1849), writer
 Miroslav Karhan (b. 1976), footballer
 Ladislav Kuna (1947–2012), footballer
 András Révész (1896–1970), biographer, journalist, and writer
 Jozef Seilnacht (1859–1939), altar builder
 Richard Müller (b. 1961) singer-songwriter

Twin towns — sister cities

Hlohovec is twinned with:
 De Panne, Belgium
 Hranice, Czech Republic
 Slovenske Konjice, Slovenia

See also
 List of municipalities and towns in Slovakia

References

Genealogical resources

The records for genealogical research are available at the state archive "Statny Archiv in Bratislava, Nitra, Slovakia"

 Roman Catholic church records (births/marriages/deaths): 1660_1901 (parish A)
 Lutheran church records (births/marriages/deaths): 1792-1928 (parish B)

External links
 - Official website
 - Hlohovecko.sk - Regional Information System
 - Historical photos of Hlohovec
 - Virtual Tour of Hlohovec
Surnames of living people in Hlohovec

Cities and towns in Slovakia
Hlohovec District